The 1919 Oklahoma A&M Aggies football team represented Oklahoma A&M College in the 1919 college football season. This was the 19th year of football at A&M and the second under Jim Pixlee. The Aggies played their home games at Lewis Field in Stillwater, Oklahoma. They finished the season 3–3–2 overall and 0–2 in the Southwest Conference.

Schedule

References

Oklahoma AandM
Oklahoma State Cowboys football seasons
Oklahoma AandM